The Veterans Bridge is a steel and welded girder bridge that carries Interstate 579 over the Allegheny River in Pittsburgh, Pennsylvania. Completed in 1988 it cost $420 million (or $ in  terms). It opened on November 11, 1988 complete with 107th National Guard howitzers firing ceremoniously from the deck, as the last link in I-579.
The roadway atop the structure is seven lanes wide, with six lanes dedicated to northbound and southbound traffic (three per direction) and one lane designed for reversible High Occupancy Vehicle (HOV-2) movements.

The bridge is also designated "pghe585-17".

See also
 
 
 
 List of crossings of the Allegheny River

References

See also
List of crossings of the Allegheny River

Bridges in Pittsburgh
Bridges over the Allegheny River
Monuments and memorials in Pittsburgh
Bridges completed in 1987
Road bridges in Pennsylvania
Bridges on the Interstate Highway System
1987 establishments in Pennsylvania
Interstate 79
Steel bridges in the United States
Girder bridges in the United States